The 1945 World Professional Basketball Tournament was the 7th edition of the World Professional Basketball Tournament. It was held in Chicago, Illinois, during the days of 19–24 March 1945 and featured 14 teams. It was won by the Fort Wayne Zollner Pistons who defeated the Dayton Acmes 78–52 in the championship game. The Chicago American Gears came in third after beating the New York Rens 64–55 in the third-place game. Buddy Jeannette of Fort Wayne was named the tournaments Most Valuable Player.

Results

First round
19 March - Chicago American Gears 58, Hartford Nutmegs 47
19 March - Oshkosh All-Stars 60, Detroit Mansfields 56
19 March - New York Rens 67, Indianapolis Oilers 59
19 March - Midland Dow Chemicals 61, Cleveland Allmen Transfers 46
19 March - Pittsburgh Raiders 53, Newark C-O Twos 50
19 March - Dayton Acmes 43, Long Island Grumman Hellcats 27

Quarter-finals
21 March - Fort Wayne Zollner Pistons 63, Oshkosh All-Stars 52
21 March - New York Rens 61, Pittsburgh Raiders 52
21 March - Dayton Acmes 52, Midland Dow Chemicals 50
21 March - Chicago American Gears 53, Harlem Globetrotters 49

Semi-finals
22 March - Dayton Acmes 80, Chicago American Gears 51
22 March - Fort Wayne Zollner Pistons 68, New York Rens 45

Third place game

Championship game

Individual awards

All-Tournament First team
F - Bruce Hale, Dayton Acmes 
F - Buddy Jeannette, Fort Wayne Zollner Pistons (MVP)
C - John Mahnken, Dayton Acmes
G - Bobby McDermott, Fort Wayne Zollner Pistons
G - Dick Triptow, Chicago American Gears

All-Tournament Second team
F - Chick Reiser, Fort Wayne Zollner Pistons 
F - Ray Patterson, Midland Dow Chemicals
C - Jake Pelkington, Midland Dow Chemicals
G - Jerry Bush, Fort Wayne Zollner Pistons
G - Mel Riebe, Cleveland Allmen Transfers
G - Puggy Bell, New York Rens

References

External links
WPBT 1939-48 on apbr.org

World Professional Basketball Tournament